New Taipei Metro is a transit system serving New Taipei, Taiwan, operated by . The Danhai light rail and Ankeng light rail currently operate, and the Sanying line is under construction. There are many other lines in various stages of planning, such as the Shenkeng light rail. Concurrently, these services are connected to Taipei Metro but operate independently.

Danhai light rail 

The Danhai light rail is a light rail transit (LRT) network located in Tamsui District, New Taipei, Taiwan. It opened on 24 December 2018.

Ankeng light rail 

Ankeng LRT serves the Xindian District (Ankeng) of New Taipei City by connecting the Circular line's Shisizhang metro station with Shuangcheng light rail station. Construction started around April 2016 and is well away on the road level part between station K1 and K5, with the first tracks having been laid in November 2018. As of October 2021 the project was 83.69% complete. From station K6 to K9 the tracks are elevated, as well as K2. As of June 2018, the entire section from station K1 to K6 is clearly visible on Google maps running down the middle of Anyi Rd and then turning right onto Anjie Rd, passing through a cemetery and going across Ankang Road. As of September 2018, work has started on the bridge across the Xindian River to Shisizhang station. On February 10, 2023, the Ankeng LRT officially started operations and passengers can ride for free during the first month.

Sanying line 

The Sanying line is a metro line under construction, serving Sanxia and Yingge districts. The line shares the same terminus with 's terminal station, .

References 

 
2018 establishments in Taiwan
Transportation in New Taipei

750 V DC railway electrification